Hassium (108Hs) is a synthetic element, and thus a standard atomic weight cannot be given. Like all synthetic elements, it has no stable isotopes. The first isotope to be synthesized was 265Hs in 1984. There are 13 known isotopes from 263Hs to 277Hs and 1–4 isomers. The most stable isotope of hassium cannot be determined based on existing data due to uncertainty that arises from the low number of measurements. The confidence interval of half-life of 269Hs corresponding to one standard deviation (the interval is ~68.3% likely to contain the actual value) is  seconds, whereas that of 270Hs is  seconds. It is also possible that 277mHs is more stable than both of these, with its half-life likely being  seconds, but only one event of decay of this isotope has been registered as of 2016.

List of isotopes 

|-
| 263Hs
| style="text-align:right" | 108
| style="text-align:right" | 155
| 263.12856(37)#
| 760(40) µs
| α
| 259Sg
| 3/2+#
|-
| rowspan=2|264Hs
| rowspan=2 style="text-align:right" | 108
| rowspan=2 style="text-align:right" | 156
| rowspan=2|264.12836(3)
| rowspan=2|540(300) µs
| α (50%)
| 260Sg
| rowspan=2|0+
|-
| SF (50%)
| (various)
|-
| 265Hs
| style="text-align:right" | 108
| style="text-align:right" | 157
| 265.129793(26)
| 1.96(0.16) ms
| α
| 261Sg
| 9/2+#
|-
| style="text-indent:.3em" | 265mHs
| colspan="3" style="text-indent:2em" | 300(70) keV
| 360(150) µs
| α
| 261Sg
| 3/2+#
|-
| rowspan=2|266Hs
| rowspan=2 style="text-align:right" | 108
| rowspan=2 style="text-align:right" | 158
| rowspan=2|266.13005(4)
| rowspan=2|3.02(0.54) ms
| α (68%)
| 262Sg
| rowspan=2|0+
|-
| SF (32%)
| (various)
|-
| style="text-indent:.3em" | 266mHs
| colspan="3" style="text-indent:2em" | 1100(70) keV
| 280(220) ms
| α
| 262Sg
| 9-#
|-
| 267Hs
| style="text-align:right" | 108
| style="text-align:right" | 159
| 267.13167(10)#
| 55(11) ms
| α
| 263Sg
| 5/2+#
|-
| style="text-indent:.3em" | 267mHs
| colspan="3" style="text-indent:2em" | 39(24) keV
| 990(90) µs
| α
| 263Sg
|
|-
| 268Hs
| style="text-align:right" | 108
| style="text-align:right" | 160
| 268.13187(30)#
| 1.42(1.13) s
| α
| 264Sg
| 0+
|-
| 269Hs
| style="text-align:right" | 108
| style="text-align:right" | 161
| 269.13375(13)#
| 16 s
| α
| 265Sg
| 9/2+#
|-
| 270Hs
| style="text-align:right" | 108
| style="text-align:right" | 162
| 270.13429(27)#
| 10 s
| α
| 266Sg
| 0+
|-
| 271Hs
| style="text-align:right" | 108
| style="text-align:right" | 163
| 271.13717(32)#
| ~4 s
| α
| 267Sg
|
|-
| 272Hs
| style="text-align:right" | 108
| style="text-align:right" | 164
| 272.13850(55)#
| ~57 ms
| α
| 268Sg
| 0+
|-
| 273Hs
| style="text-align:right" | 108
| style="text-align:right" | 165
| 273.14168(40)#
| 
| α
| 269Sg
| 3/2+#
|-
| 275Hs
| style="text-align:right" | 108
| style="text-align:right" | 167
| 275.14667(63)#
| 
| α
| 271Sg
|
|-
| 277Hs
| style="text-align:right" | 108
| style="text-align:right" | 169
| 277.15190(58)#
| 12(9) ms
| SF
| (various)
| 3/2+#
|-
| style="text-indent:.3em" | 277mHs
| colspan="3" style="text-indent:2em" | 100(100) keV#
| 130(100) s
| SF
| (various)
|

Isotopes and nuclear properties

Target-projectile combinations leading to Z=108 compound nuclei

Nucleosynthesis
Superheavy elements such as hassium are produced by bombarding lighter elements in particle accelerators that induce fusion reactions. Whereas most of the isotopes of hassium can be synthesized directly this way, some heavier ones have only been observed as decay products of elements with higher atomic numbers.

Depending on the energies involved, the former are separated into "hot" and "cold". In hot fusion reactions, very light, high-energy projectiles are accelerated toward very heavy targets (actinides), giving rise to compound nuclei at high excitation energy (~40–50 MeV) that may either fission or evaporate several (3 to 5) neutrons. In cold fusion reactions, the produced fused nuclei have a relatively low excitation energy (~10–20 MeV), which decreases the probability that these products will undergo fission reactions. As the fused nuclei cool to the ground state, they require emission of only one or two neutrons, and thus, allows for the generation of more neutron-rich products. The latter is a distinct concept from that of where nuclear fusion claimed to be achieved at room temperature conditions (see cold fusion).

Cold fusion
Before the first successful synthesis of hassium in 1984 by the GSI team, scientists at the Joint Institute for Nuclear Research (JINR) in Dubna, Russia also tried to synthesize hassium by bombarding lead-208 with iron-58 in 1978. No hassium atoms were identified. They repeated the experiment in 1984 and were able to detect a spontaneous fission activity assigned to 260Sg, the daughter of 264Hs. Later that year, they tried the experiment again, and tried to chemically identify the decay products of hassium to provide support to their synthesis of element 108. They were able to detect several alpha decays of 253Es and 253Fm, decay products of 265Hs.

In the official discovery of the element in 1984, the team at GSI studied the same reaction using the alpha decay genetic correlation method and were able to positively identify 3 atoms of 265Hs. After an upgrade of their facilities in 1993, the team repeated the experiment in 1994 and detected 75 atoms of 265Hs and 2 atoms of 264Hs, during the measurement of a partial excitation function for the 1n neutron evaporation channel. A further run of the reaction was conducted in late 1997 in which a further 20 atoms were detected. This discovery experiment was successfully repeated in 2002 at RIKEN (10 atoms) and in 2003 at GANIL (7 atoms). The team at RIKEN further studied the reaction in 2008 in order to conduct the first spectroscopic studies of the even-even nucleus 264Hs. They were also able to detect a further 29 atoms of 265Hs.

The team at Dubna also conducted the analogous reaction  with a lead-207 target instead of a lead-208 target in 1984:

 +  →  + 

They were able to detect the same spontaneous fission activity as observed in the reaction with a lead-208 target and once again assigned it to 260Sg, daughter of 264Hs. The team at GSI first studied the reaction in 1986 using the method of genetic correlation of alpha decays and identified a single atom of 264Hs with a cross section of 3.2 pb. The reaction was repeated in 1994 and the team were able to measure both alpha decay and spontaneous fission for 264Hs. This reaction was also studied in 2008 at RIKEN in order to conduct the first spectroscopic studies of the even-even nucleus 264Hs. The team detected 11 atoms of 264Hs.

In 2008, the team at RIKEN conducted the analogous reaction with a lead-206 target for the first time:

 +  →  + 

They were able to identify 8 atoms of the new isotope 263Hs.

In 2008, the team at the Lawrence Berkeley National Laboratory (LBNL) studied the analogous reaction with iron-56 projectiles for the first time:

 +  →  + 

They were able to produce and identify six atoms of the new isotope 263Hs. A few months later, the RIKEN team also published their results on the same reaction.

Further attempts to synthesise nuclei of hassium were performed the team at Dubna in 1983 using the cold fusion reaction between a bismuth-209 target and manganese-55 projectiles:

 +  →  + x  (x = 1 or 2)

They were able to detect a spontaneous fission activity assigned to 255Rf, a product of the 263Hs decay chain. Identical results were measured in a repeat run in 1984. In a subsequent experiment in 1983, they applied the method of chemical identification of a descendant to provide support to the synthesis of hassium. They were able to detect alpha decays from fermium isotopes, assigned as descendants of the decay of 262Hs. This reaction has not been tried since and 262Hs is currently unconfirmed.

Hot fusion
Under the leadership of Yuri Oganessian, the team at the Joint Institute for Nuclear Research studied the hot fusion reaction between calcium-48 projectiles and radium-226 targets in 1978:

 +  →  + 4 

However, results are not available in the literature. The reaction was repeated at the JINR in June 2008 and 4 atoms of the isotope 270Hs were detected. In January 2009, the team repeated the experiment and a further 2 atoms of 270Hs were detected.

The team at Dubna studied the reaction between californium-249 targets and neon-22 projectiles in 1983 by detecting spontaneous fission activities:

 +  →  + x 

Several short spontaneous fission activities were found, indicating the formation of nuclei of hassium.

The hot fusion reaction between uranium-238 targets and projectiles of the rare and expensive isotope sulfur-36 was conducted at the GSI in April–May 2008:

 +  →  + 4 

Preliminary results show that a single atom of 270Hs was detected. This experiment confirmed the decay properties of the isotopes 270Hs and 266Sg.

In March 1994, the team at Dubna led by the late Yuri Lazarev attempted the analogous reaction with sulfur-34 projectiles:

 +  →  + x  (x = 4 or 5)

They announced the detection of 3 atoms of 267Hs from the 5n neutron evaporation channel. The decay properties were confirmed by the team at GSI in their simultaneous study of darmstadtium. The reaction was repeated at the GSI in January–February 2009 in order to search for the new isotope 268Hs. The team, led by Prof. Nishio, detected a single atom each of both 268Hs and 267Hs. The new isotope 268Hs underwent alpha decay to the previously known isotope 264Sg.

Between May 2001 and August 2005, a GSI–PSI (Paul Scherrer Institute) collaboration studied the nuclear reaction between curium-248 targets and magnesium-26 projectiles:

 +  →  + x  (x = 3, 4, or 5)

The team studied the excitation function of the 3n, 4n, and 5n evaporation channels leading to the isotopes 269Hs, 270Hs, and 271Hs. The synthesis of the doubly magic isotope 270Hs was published in December 2006 by the team of scientists from the Technical University of Munich. It was reported that this isotope decayed by emission of an alpha particle with an energy of 8.83 MeV and a half-life of ~22 s. This figure has since been revised to 3.6 s.

As decay product

Hassium isotopes have been observed as decay products of darmstadtium. Darmstadtium currently has ten known isotopes, all but one of which have been shown to undergo alpha decays to become hassium nuclei with mass numbers between 263 and 277. Hassium isotopes with mass numbers 266, 272, 273, 275, and 277 to date have only been produced by decay of darmstadtium nuclei. Parent darmstadtium nuclei can be themselves decay products of copernicium, flerovium, or livermorium. For example, in 2004, the Dubna team identified hassium-277 as a final product in the decay of livermorium-293 via an alpha decay sequence:

 →  + 
 →  + 
 →  + 
 →  +

Unconfirmed isotopes

277mHs
An isotope assigned to 277Hs has been observed on one occasion decaying by SF with a long half-life of ~11 minutes. The isotope is not observed in the decay of the ground state of 281Ds but is observed in the decay from a rare, as yet unconfirmed isomeric level, namely 281mDs. The half-life is very long for the ground state and it is possible that it belongs to an isomeric level in 277Hs. It has also been suggested that this activity actually comes from 278Bh, formed as the great-great-granddaughter of 290Fl through one electron capture to 290Nh and three further alpha decays. Furthermore, in 2009, the team at the GSI observed a small alpha decay branch for 281Ds producing the nuclide 277Hs decaying by SF in a short lifetime. The measured half-life is close to the expected value for ground state isomer, 277Hs. Further research is required to confirm the production of the isomer.

Retracted isotopes
273Hs
In 1999, American scientists at the University of California, Berkeley, announced that they had succeeded in synthesizing three atoms of 293118. These parent nuclei were reported to have successively emitted three alpha particles to form hassium-273 nuclei, which were claimed to have undergone an alpha decay, emitting alpha particles with decay energies of 9.78 and 9.47 MeV and half-life 1.2 s, but their claim was retracted in 2001. The isotope, however, was produced in 2010 by the same team. The new data matched the previous (fabricated) data.

270Hs: prospects for a deformed doubly magic nucleus
According to macroscopic-microscopic (MM) theory, Z = 108 is a deformed proton magic number, in combination with the neutron shell at N = 162. This means that such nuclei are permanently deformed in their ground state but have high, narrow fission barriers to further deformation and hence relatively long SF partial half-lives. The SF half-lives in this region are typically reduced by a factor of 109 in comparison with those in the vicinity of the spherical doubly magic nucleus 298Fl, caused by an increase in the probability of barrier penetration by quantum tunnelling, due to the narrower fission barrier.
In addition, N = 162 has been calculated as a deformed neutron magic number and hence the nucleus 270Hs has promise as a deformed doubly magic nucleus. Experimental data from the decay of Z = 110 isotopes 271Ds and 273Ds, provides strong evidence for the magic nature of the N = 162 sub-shell. The recent synthesis of 269Hs, 270Hs, and 271Hs also fully support the assignment of N = 162 as a magic closed shell. In particular, the low decay energy for 270Hs is in complete agreement with calculations.

Evidence for the Z = 108 deformed proton shell
Evidence for the magicity of the Z = 108 proton shell can be deemed from two sources:
 the variation in the partial spontaneous fission half-lives for isotones
 the large gap in Qα for isotonic pairs between Z = 108 and Z = 110.

For SF, it is necessary to measure the half-lives for the isotonic nuclei 268Sg, 270Hs and 272Ds. Since fission of 270Hs has not been measured, detailed data of 268Sg fission is not yet available, and 272Ds is still unknown, this method cannot be used to date to confirm the stabilizing nature of the Z = 108 shell.
However, good evidence for the magicity of Z = 108 can be deemed from the large differences in the alpha decay energies measured for 270Hs, 271Ds and 273Ds. More conclusive evidence would come from the determination of the decay energy of the yet-unknown nuclide 272Ds.

Nuclear isomerism
277Hs
An isotope assigned to 277Hs has been observed on one occasion decaying by spontaneous fission with a long half-life of ~11 minutes. The isotope is not observed in the decay of the most common isomer of 281Ds but is observed in the decay from a rare, as yet unconfirmed isomeric level, namely 281mDs. The half-life is very long for the ground state and it is possible that it belongs to an isomeric level in 277Hs. Furthermore, in 2009, the team at the GSI observed a small alpha decay branch for 281Ds producing an isotope of 277Hs decaying by spontaneous fission with a short lifetime. The measured half-life is close to the expected value for ground state isomer, 277Hs. Further research is required to confirm the production of the isomer. A more recent study suggests that this observed activity may actually be from 278Bh.

269Hs
The direct synthesis of 269Hs has resulted in the observation of three alpha particles with energies 9.21, 9.10, and 8.94 MeV emitted from 269Hs atoms. However, when this isotope is indirectly synthesized from the decay of 277Cn, only alpha particles with energy 9.21 MeV have been observed, indicating that this decay occurs from an isomeric level. Further research is required to confirm this.

267Hs
267Hs is known to decay by alpha decay, emitting alpha particles with energies of 9.88, 9.83, and 9.75 MeV. It has a half-life of 52 ms. In the recent syntheses of 271Ds and 271mDs, additional activities have been observed. A 0.94 ms activity emitting alpha particles with energy 9.83 MeV has been observed in addition to longer lived ~0.8 s and ~6.0 s activities. Currently, none of these are assigned and confirmed and further research is required to positively identify them.

265Hs
The synthesis of 265Hs has also provided evidence for two isomeric levels. The ground state decays by emission of an alpha particle with energy 10.30 MeV and has a half-life of 2.0 ms. The isomeric state has 300 keV of excess energy and decays by the emission of an alpha particle with energy 10.57 MeV and has a half-life of 0.75 ms.

Future experiments
Scientists at the GSI are planning to search for isomers of 270Hs using the reaction 226Ra(48Ca,4n) in 2010 using the new TASCA facility at the GSI. In addition, they also hope to study the spectroscopy of 269Hs, 265Sg and 261Rf, using the reaction 248Cm(26Mg,5n) or 226Ra(48Ca,5n). This will allow them to determine the level structure in 265Sg and 261Rf and attempt to give spin and parity assignments to the various proposed isomers.

Physical production yields
The tables below provides cross-sections and excitation energies for nuclear reactions that produce isotopes of hassium directly. Data in bold represent maxima derived from excitation function measurements. + represents an observed exit channel.

Cold fusion

Hot fusion

Theoretical calculations

Evaporation residue cross sections
The below table contains various targets-projectile combinations for which calculations have provided estimates for cross section yields from various neutron evaporation channels. The channel with the highest expected yield is given.

DNS = Di-nuclear system ; σ = cross section

Notes

References 

National Nuclear Data Center, Brookhaven National Laboratory 

Isotope masses from:

Isotopic compositions and standard atomic masses from:

Half-life, spin, and isomer data selected from:

 
Hassium
Hassium